The Institute and Faculty of Actuaries is the professional body which represents and regulates actuaries in the United Kingdom.

History

The Institute and Faculty of Actuaries came into being on 1 August 2010 as a result of the merger of the Institute of Actuaries and the Faculty of Actuaries in Scotland after voting members of both bodies voted to merge their respective organisations in a ballot held on 25 May 2010.

Structure and governance
The Queen in Council granted an amendment effective 1 August 2010 to the Charter of the Institute of Actuaries in terms that converted it to the Charter for the Institute and Faculty of Actuaries. The assets, liabilities and membership rights of the Faculty of Actuaries in Scotland were transferred on this same day to the Institute and Faculty of Actuaries and the Charter of the Faculty of Actuaries in Scotland was surrendered. Essential elements of the merger arrangements, such as the Scottish constituency and its representation on the Council of the Institute and Faculty of Actuaries, are incorporated into the new governance documents.

Authority for the governance, control and strategic direction of the Institute and Faculty of Actuaries sits with the Council which delegates to various boards, committees and staff.

President
The President of the Institute and Faculty of Actuaries (IFoA) is Tan Suee Chieh. His term began on 17 June 2020. He succeeded John Taylor, who now takes up the title of Immediate Past President. The President-elect is Louise Pryor.

Research and member support
Actuaries work in a number of different practice areas: enterprise risk management, finance and investment, general insurance, health and care, life insurance and pensions.

Each of these areas is supported by an executive committee which oversees the development of knowledge and research within its own area, provides members with CPD opportunities and takes forward a programme of practice-specific research. The committees also foster a sense of community among actuaries practising in their particular field of expertise.

Enterprise risk management - helping companies understand and manage risk in line with their business objectives
Finance and investment - for actuaries working in banking, corporate finance and investment
General insurance - rating products, advising on reserves and capital requirements, and similar general insurance activity
Health and care - a growing area in both the private and public sectors as health provision models evolve to meet changing needs
Life insurance - a traditional area for actuaries, with the roles evolving as life insurance itself evolves
Pensions - actuaries play a key role in advising companies on all manner of pension schemes and structures.

Regulation

The Institute and Faculty of Actuaries sets examinations, continuing professional development, professional codes and disciplinary standards. After the 2005 Morris Review raised concerns that the (then) Institute of Actuaries had failed to keep its syllabus and teaching materials up to date, the result of ‘entrenched commercial interests’ hindering the development of the Institute's education policy, the Review proposed a regime of independent oversight of the Institute's regulation of the profession by the Financial Reporting Council. As a result, the FRC assumed responsibility for oversight of the actuarial profession and the independent setting of actuarial technical standards with effect from May 2006.

In 2018 the Kingman Review found that the FRC's oversight of the actuarial profession had not in practice proved 'an altogether effective arrangement'. It was based on a voluntary understanding, and the FRC had no powers with which to enforce 'any meaningful oversight of the IFoA'. The UK Treasury, supported by the Government Actuary, told the Review they wished to see effective regulatory oversight of the actuarial profession., and the Review recommended that the Government, working with the PRA and The Pensions Regulator (TPR), 'should review what powers are required effectively to oversee regulation of the actuarial profession'.

Alongside this, a report by financial economist Kevin Dowd claimed that the Institute 'had allowed itself to be used as a mouthpiece for ERM industry leaders to broadcast their misunderstanding of their products in pursuit of their commercial interests' following a review by the UK Prudential Regulation Authority in 2018 concluding that firms investing in equity release mortgages were not properly reflecting the cost of the no-negative-equity guarantee. The UK satirical magazine Private Eye also carried a story alleging that the PRA's investigation had been delayed by 'years of lobbying' from firms including accountants KPMG and Ernst & Young, and by the Institute itself.

Education
Fully qualified actuaries are Fellows and may bear the designations FIA or FFA while Associates bear the designations AIA or AFA.

Practising certificates are issued to certain actuaries for their statutory role in the financial management of life offices and most pension schemes. The Institute and Faculty of Actuaries continues the former Institute’s role as a designated professional body, under the Financial Services and Markets Act 2000, which enables it to license firms that are managed or controlled by actuaries, allowing them to carry on certain limited regulated activities.

UK Practice Modules 
For students working in the UK only
 P1 - Health and Care 
 P2 - Life Insurance 
 P3 - General Insurance 
 P4 - Pensions 
 P5 - Finance 
 P6 - Investment

An actuarial qualification from the Institute and Faculty of Actuaries consists of a combination of the completion of various examinations and courses. The examinations are split into four sections: core technical, core applications, specialist technical, and specialist applications. 
In addition to examinations and courses, it is required that the candidate both complete at least three years work as an actuary and to qualify as a Fellow.

Qualification
An actuarial qualification from the Institute and Faculty of Actuaries consists of a combination of the completion of various examinations and courses. The examinations are split into four sections: Core Technical (CT), Core Applications (CA), Specialist Technical (ST), and Specialist Applications (SA). Study material for the examinations is usually obtained through the official bookshop of the Institute of Actuaries  or through the Actuarial Education Company (ActEd), a subsidiary of BPP Actuarial Education Ltd.

In addition to examinations and courses, it is required that the candidate complete at least three years work as an actuary to qualify as a “Fellow of the Institute and Faculty of Actuaries” (FIA)

Core Examinations
The Core Technical section consists of 8 written exams and a “Business Awareness Module,” CT9. These are usually sat first by a candidate and include the underlying mathematics involved in actuarial work as well as an introduction to financial and economic issues.  These are also the most common exams for which candidates may get exemptions.

The Core Applications section consists of a 6-hour written exam and two practical exams which focus on the application of concepts learned and a candidate's ability to communicate actuarial concepts to others.

Specialist Examinations
The Specialist Technical section is the first stage the candidate has a choice of which exams to take.  The candidate chooses two from the various actuarial specialist subjects i.e. Health and Care, Life Insurance, General Insurance, Pensions, Finance or Investments and further technical knowledge on said subjects is attained.

The Specialist Applications section allows the candidate to choose one area for which they take the SA paper and attain full Fellowship; leading to many referring to this as the “Fellowship paper.” However, as the rules on the ordering of examinations were relaxed, this examination may be taken before taking some earlier examinations resulting in candidates qualifying on other papers.

List of Examinations

Core Technical Stage
 CM1 - Actuarial Mathematics
 CM2 - Financial Engineering and Loss Reserving
 CB1 - Business Finance
 CB2 - Business Economics
 CB3 - Business Management
 CS1 - Actuarial Statistics 
 CS2 - Risk Modelling and Survival Analysis

Core Applications Stage
 CP1 - Actuarial Practice
 CP2 - Modelling Practice
 CP3 - Communications Practice

Specialist Principles Stage
 SP0 -	Alternative Specialist Principles(not examined)
 SP1 - Health and Care
 SP2 - Life Insurances
 SP4 - Pensions and other Benefits
 SP5 - Investment and Finance 
 SP6 - Financial Derivatives
 SP7 - General Insurance - Reserving and Capital Modelling
 SP8 - General Insurance - Pricing
 SP9 - Enterprise Risk Management

Specialist Advanced Stage
 SA0 -	Research Dissertation Specialist Applications
 SA1 - Health and Care
 SA2 - Life Insurance
 SA3 - General Insurance
 SA4 - Pensions and other Benefits
 SA7 - Investment & Finance

Qualifications

Certificate in Financial Mathematics
The Certificate in Financial Mathematics is issued by the Institute and Faculty of Actuaries.

Diploma in Actuarial Techniques
The Diploma in Actuarial Techniques is sent to students on completion of all Core Technical stage subjects: CT1, CT2, CT3, CT4, CT5, CT6, CT7, CT8 and CT9.

Certificate in Finance and Investment
The Certificate in Finance and Investment is sent to all students who complete or are exempted from CT1, CT2, CT4, CT7, CT8, CT9 and CA1.

Associate of the Institute and Faculty of Actuaries
On completion of all of the Core Technical and Core Applications exams, then students can become Associate members of the Institute and Faculty of Actuaries and gain the right to describe themselves as an actuary and to use the letters AIA or AFA provided that they have two years of work experience as an actuary.

Fellow of the Institute and Faculty of Actuaries
On completion of all of the Associate exams, two of the Specialist technical subjects and one of the Specialist applications subjects, students can become Fellows of the Institute and Faculty of Actuaries and to use the letters FIA or FFA provided that they have three years of work experience as an actuary.

Alternative routes to Fellowship are:
 By vote of the membership
 By mutual recognition of qualifications
 Honorary Fellow

Qualifications linked to the IFoA

Chartered Enterprise Risk Actuary (CERA)
Associates and Fellows gain a further qualification, CERA, if they pass the SP9 Enterprise Risk Management exam.

Certified Actuarial Analyst
This new qualification will be obtained after passing 6 modules.  Module 0 tests basic mathematics (with a its syllabus based on the Foundational ActEd Course written by ActEd (The Actuarial Education Company)), Modules 1-4 tests parts of the CTs and Module 5 tests audit trails (CA2).

Examination fees

Two-tier charging structure
The Institute and Faculty of Actuaries operates a two-tier charging structure for its examination fees: full rate and reduced rate. The reduced rate is at a discount to the full rate.

To qualify for a reduced rate, the student member must have an income which is less than £7 140 per annum regardless of where you live or work

Student members from a list of specific countries can purchase educational materials from Acted at a discount.

Examination fees
Rates as at 2017 are as follows:

Full rate

CT stage: £220 per subject. ST stage: £305 per subject. CA1: £595. CA2: £450. CP3: £310. SA stage: £305 per subject.

Reduced rate

CT stage: £115 per subject. ST stage: £155 per subject. CA1: £300. CA2: £260. CP3: £160. SA stage: £155 per subject.

Public policy submissions

UK government's Shortage Occupation List

Shortage Occupation List background and purpose

When occupations are placed on this list, UK employers have less restrictions for recruiting candidates directly from overseas; specifically from outside the EU. They would no longer need to complete a residency test, which involves demonstrating that a search for suitable candidates within the UK in the first instance has been unsuccessful.

Actuaries added to the shortage occupation list
In November 2011, actuaries were added to the UK government's Shortage Occupation List. The actuarial profession had argued for actuaries' inclusion on this list.

Removal from shortage occupation list
Actuaries were removed from the shortage occupation list in April 2013 following a consultation by the UK government's Migration Advisory Committee in January 2013. On this occasion, the actuarial profession made no submission either way; neither for nor against a shortage of actuaries.

Statistics on shortage occupation list migrants

Despite the actuarial profession advising a shortage of actuaries, freedom of information requests to the UK Border Agency (now superseded by UK Visas and Immigration) have revealed that only 19 people emigrated to the UK to work as an actuary via the shortage occupation list from 1 November 2011 to 12 March 2013.

The countries of origin for these migrants were as follows: Australia (6), China (1), India (4), Malaysia (1), South Africa (5) and United States (2).

The salaries of these migrants ranged from £42,500 (actuary) to £186,261 (chief actuary). The average salary was £82,042.

Despite Solvency II Directive work being cited as a reason for a shortage of actuaries, only one migrant had the description "Solvency II" in their job title.

References

External links
Actuarial Profession website
Actuarial Profession eshop
Actuarial Profession Libraries

Actuarial associations
Actuaries
2010 establishments in the United Kingdom
Organizations established in 2010